Klodian is an Albanian male given name. It is a topographic name, meaning a person from the ancient Roman city of Klodiana, called Claudiana in English, which is now Peqin, Albania. The feminine form is Klodiana. The name may refer to:

Klodian Asllani (born 1977), Albanian footballer
Klodian Arbëri (born 1979), Albanian footballer
Klodian Duro (born 1977), Albanian footballer
Klodian Gino (born 1994), Albanian footballer 
Klodian Samina (born 1989), Albanian footballer
Klodiana Shala (born 1979), Albanian athlete
Klodian Skënderi (born 1984), Albanian footballer
Klodian Sulollari (born 1989), Albanian footballer
Klodian Xhelilaj (born 1988), Albanian footballer

References

Albanian masculine given names